Roger Van Gool (born 1 June 1950) is a Belgian former professional footballer who played as a forward. He made seven appearances for the Belgium national team scoring two goals.

Club career
In 1976, Van Gool joined 1. FC Köln, becoming the first player in German football to be signed for a transfer fee of DM 1 million.

Honours 
Club Brugge
 Belgian First Division: 1975–76
 UEFA Cup: 1975–76 (runner-up)

1. FC Köln
 Bundesliga: 1977–78
 German Cup: 1976–77, 1977–78

References

External links
 
 
 
 Roger van Gool at WorldFootball.net 
 

1950 births
Living people
Belgian footballers
Association football forwards
Belgium international footballers
Royal Antwerp F.C. players
Club Brugge KV players
1. FC Köln players
Coventry City F.C. players
Nîmes Olympique players
K. Sint-Niklase S.K.E. players
Belgian Pro League players
Ligue 1 players
Bundesliga players
English Football League players
Belgian expatriate footballers
Belgian expatriate sportspeople in Germany
Expatriate footballers in Germany
Belgian expatriate sportspeople in France
Expatriate footballers in France
Belgian expatriate sportspeople in England
Expatriate footballers in England